North Riverfront Park is a municipal park in St. Louis, Missouri.

Description

The park is the northernmost park in St. Louis. It contains a lake and a trail for biking/walking. In 2008, The Riverfront Times gave the lake the award for "Best Fishing Hole".

Geography
North Riverfront is located on Riverview Dr. and Scranton. It is bordered by the Mississippi River to the east.

Surrounding areas
It is surrounded by the neighborhood of North Riverfront.

See also
People and culture of St. Louis, Missouri
Neighborhoods of St. Louis
Parks in St. Louis, Missouri

References

External links

Parks in St. Louis
Culture of St. Louis
Tourist attractions in St. Louis
1980 establishments in Missouri